The 1941 Argentine Primera División was the 50th season of top-flight football in Argentina. The season began on March 30 and ended on November 15. The number of teams was reduced from 18 to 16.

League standings

References

Argentine Primera División seasons
Argentine Primera Division
Primera Division